, who was also known as Hanbei (半兵衛), was a Japanese samurai during the Sengoku period of the 16th century. Hanbei was the castle lord in command of Bodaiyama Castle. He was a chief strategist and adviser of Toyotomi Hideyoshi. His father was a local samurai Takenaka Shigemoto. He initially served the Saitō clan of Mino Province, but later plotted an uprising and took over the Saitō clan's Gifu Castle.

Biography
Shigeharu was born in 1544 as the son of Takenaka Shigemoto, the lord of Ōmidō Castle in the Ōno District of Mino Province and a retainer of the Mino-Saitō clan.

In 1556, Shigeharu had his first battle at the Battle of Nagaragawa. He allied with Saitō Dōsan, and  replaced his father as the "commander in chief" against Saitō Yoshitatsu.

In 1560, after the death or retirement of Shigemoto, Shigeharu succeeded him as head of the family and became the lord of Bodaisan Castle.

In 1561, after the death of Yoshitatsu, Shigeharu served Yoshitatsu's son and heir, Saitō Tatsuoki, who took over at the age of thirteen. Tatsuoki, however, indulged in a decadent lifestyle and did not pay attention to affairs of governance. As a result, in 1564, Shigeharu joint Mino Triumvirate to attack Tatsuoki at Inabayama Castle, killing Saitō Hida-no-kami, causing Tatsuoki to flee. But later, Tatsuoki appeared to have taken back the castle and Shigeharu abandoning the castle.

In 1567, during the Siege of Inabayama Castle, Shigeharu then directed the defense against the forces of Oda Nobunaga. But in the end, Tatsuoki was driven out of Inabayama Castle. After the castle fell, he left the Saitō family, and served as a guest commander under Azai Nagamasa.

In 1570, Shigeharu joint Oda clan, he participating at the Battle of Anegawa in forces led by Andō Morinari, his father in law. After battle, Nobunaga ordered Shigeharu to stay in Yokoyama Castle along with Hideyoshi. Hideyoshi was so impressed by him that he invited Shigeharu to join his forces as a strategist.

Later in 1576, he joined Hideyoshi and followed Hideyoshi in the Chūgoku Campaign. Shigeharu made many contributions to Hideyoshi with his exceptional talent in that fields.

In 1579, he died of illness during Hideyoshi's attack against the Mōri in the Chūgoku region of Japan, while Miki Castle was being besieged. Later, he was succeeded by Kuroda Yoshitaka as strategist.

Descendants
Takenaka Shigekado, Shigeharu's son and successor, continued to serve Hideyoshi after his father's death. At the Battle of Sekigahara, he fought on the side of Tokugawa Ieyasu, and his holdings at Bodaiyama Castle were secured. The Takenaka family thus became a family of hatamoto, and would soon move from their old castle of Bodaiyama Castle to the new castle called Takenaka Jinya(Tkenaka clan's fortified residence). The holdings of the Takenaka included Sekigahara Village.

In the mid-19th century, Shigeharu's descendant Takenaka Shigekata served as commander of the Tokugawa forces in Fushimi at the Battle of Toba–Fushimi.

Popular culture
He is a playable character in Pokémon Conquest (Pokémon + Nobunaga's Ambition in Japan, with his partner Pokémon being Pikachu and Raichu.)
He is also a playable character in Samurai Warriors 3, Samurai Warriors 4, Samurai Warriors 5, Warriors Orochi 3, and Warriors Orochi 4.
A young female version of Takenaka Hanbei appears in the anime The Ambition of Oda Nobuna which includes a lot of cute female versions of Sengoku period figures.
He appears in the Sengoku Basara anime series and game. His weapon of choice is a linked sword and darkness based attacks. In Anime, however, he contracted tuberculosis and dies after dueling with Kojuro Katakura.
His nickname, Hanbei, is used in the video game Sekiro: Shadows Die Twice.
Hanbei serves as an important ally to players in the 2020 video game Nioh 2. As with history, he dies mid-game from his illness during a siege. Despite this, he continues to guide the protagonist Hide from the afterlife.

See also
People of the Sengoku period in popular culture.

Notes

External links
Information on Iwate Castle (in Japanese)
Information on Bodaisan Castle (in Japanese)
Woodblock print
Photo of Shigeharu's Grave

1544 births
1579 deaths
Samurai
Toyotomi retainers